Nookala Ramachandra Reddy was a renowned politician from the Telangana.

Early life 
Nookala Ramachandra Reddy was born in Jamandlapalli, a village 4 km from Mahabubabad (earlier known as Manukota) in Warangal district of Telangana state. Born to Nookala Rangasai Reddy and Rukmini Devi, he had three brothers and one sister.

Political career 
He was elected as Member of Legislative Assembly in 1957, 1962, 1967 and 1972 from Dornakal constituency in Warangal district. In 1972 he won unopposed.

links 
 :te:Photos link in drive click the pics link (https://drive.google.com/drive/folders/1H07DRemLBkB3BW67Jd5B7VAhCveV25Co?usp=sharing)
 1957 Andhra Pradesh Legislative Assembly election (66) 
 1962 Andhra Pradesh Legislative Assembly election (276)
 1967 Andhra Pradesh Legislative Assembly election (259)
 1972 Andhra Pradesh Legislative Assembly election (259)*

References

Indian Hindus
Union Ministers from Telangana
Indian male poets
Indians imprisoned during the Emergency (India)
Prisoners and detainees of British India
People from Telangana
Telangana politicians
Telugu politicians
Osmania University alumni
Members of the Andhra Pradesh Legislative Assembly
People from Warangal